We Dive at Dawn is a 1943 war film directed by Anthony Asquith and starring John Mills and Eric Portman as Royal Navy submariners in the Second World War. It was written by Val Valentine and J. B. Williams with uncredited assistance from Frank Launder. It was produced by Edward Black. The film's sets were designed by Walter Murton.

Plot
It is April, 1942. Lieutenant Freddie Taylor and some crew of the submarine Sea Tiger are given a week's leave after an unsuccessful patrol. Leading Seaman Hobson goes home to save his marriage, while a reluctant Torpedo Gunner's Mate Corrigan departs for his wedding in London. When the crew are recalled early Corrigan is relieved, though later regrets not completing his marriage. Sea Tiger has been assigned the top secret mission to sink Nazi Germany's new battleship, the Brandenburg, before she transits the Kiel Canal for sea trials in the Baltic Sea. Sea Tiger must put to sea immediately.

Crossing the North Sea, the submarine picks up three shot-down Luftwaffe pilots from a rescue buoy, and prevents their radio alert to German forces. When the submarine enters a minefield, an airman panics and reveals the Brandenburg is further ahead than thought. The airman is attacked by a countryman and subsequently dies. Taylor decides on a desperate gamble to pursue the Brandenburg into the German-controlled Baltic Sea.

When the Brandenburg is spotted, Sea Tiger fires all its torpedoes, but dives before assessing their impact due to German destroyers dropping depth charges. By expelling oil and other debris including the body of the German airman, Taylor deceives the Germans into believing that the submarine has sunk. Although successfully escaped, Sea Tiger no longer has enough oil to reach Britain. The Germans, convinced that the Sea Tiger has been sunk, have Lord Haw Haw broadcast to Britain announcing the destruction of the Sea Tiger.

Taylor decides to have his crew abandon ship on the Danish island of Hågø (which is in fact the island of Bågø). Hobson, a former merchant seaman who speaks German and knows the port on the island, persuades Taylor to let him go ashore and search for oil. He succeeds, and Sea Tiger enters the harbour under cover of darkness, using Hobson's intelligence about the harbour depth. Aided by friendly Danish sailors, they refuel while Hobson and other crewmen hold off the German garrison. Although Pincher (the cook) is killed and Oxford and Lieutenant Johnson are wounded, they get back to the re-fuelled submarine and start to leave the port. While they leave though, the tanker they were able to refuel from is hit by German shells and catches fire. Taylor, not wanting to risk the Sea Tiger any longer, continues to leave the port and makes it out to the open sea.

While returning to Britain, the crew are met by an escorting trawler and learn from them that they sank the Brandenburg. The Sea Tiger returns to base, flying the Jolly Roger for the first time.

Cast
John Mills as Lieutenant Freddie Taylor, Captain
Louis Bradfield as Lieutenant Brace, First Officer
Ronald Millar as Lieutenant Ronnie Johnson, Third Officer
Jack Watling as Lieutenant Gordon, Navigating Officer
Reginald Purdell as C/P.O. (Chief Petty Officer) "Dicky" Dabbs, Coxswain
Caven Watson as C/P.O. Jock Duncan, Chief Engine Room Artificer
Niall MacGinnis as C/P.O. Mike Corrigan, Torpedo Gunner's Mate
Eric Portman as L/S (Leading Seaman) James Hobson, on hydrophones
Leslie Weston as L/S Tug Wilson, Leading Torpedo Operator
Norman Williams as "Canada", Periscope Operator
Lionel Grose as "Spud", Torpedo Operator
David Peel as "Oxford", Helmsman
Philip Godfrey as "Flunkey", Steward
Robb Wilton as "Pincher", Cook
Joan Hopkins as Ethel Dabbs 
Walter Gotell as the ardent Nazi pilot, uncredited
John Slater as Charlie
Philip Friend as Captain Humphries

Production
We Dive at Dawn was filmed at Gaumont-British Studios in London, with the co-operation of the British Admiralty. John Mills prepared for his role as the captain of Sea Tiger by sailing in a submarine on a training mission down the Clyde. He recalled a crash dive: The ship then seemed to stand on her nose and I felt her speeding like an arrow towards the sea bed; charts and crockery went flying in all directions; I hung on to a rail near the periscope trying to look heroic and totally unconcerned; the only thing that concerned me was the fact that I was sure that my face had turned a pale shade of pea-green.

Exterior shots of the submarines P614 and P615 were used for Sea Tiger (with the final number painted over to make "P61"). The vessels were a Turkish S-class submarine that had been part of a consignment ordered by the Turkish Navy from the British company Vickers in 1939. But with the outbreak of World War II, the four boats were requisitioned by the Royal Navy and designated the P611 class in the British Fleet. They were similar in design but slightly smaller than the British S class, although with a higher conning tower. The S-class boat  also appears in the film.

Home media
The film has been issued on VHS by Madacy Records and Timeless Multimedia among others, and on DVD by ITV DVD and Carlton.

References
Notes
While this is a WWII plot featuring a fictional German battleship named Brandenburg (and based heavily on the 'pocket battleships' of the ), the last German battleship to bear this name had been the pre-dreadnought , which was in reserve status throughout WW1 and was broken up for scrap in 1919-1920. The name was used simply because it was, at the time of filming, an unused name appropriate for the fictional warship.

External links
 
 
 
 Rescue buoy featured in the film

1943 films
1943 war films
British war films
British World War II films
British black-and-white films
Royal Navy in World War II films
World War II submarine films
World War II films made in wartime
Gainsborough Pictures films
Films directed by Anthony Asquith
Films set in the Baltic Sea
1940s English-language films
1940s British films